Dirty Disco is a DJ duo consisting of Houston-native Mark De Lange and Londoner JD Arnold.

Members
JD Arnold started DJing during the disco era in the 1970s in the United Kingdom where he has worked at Heaven, a nightclub in London. He was invited for a visit to the United States by a friend in 1981, and moved there because he enjoyed the environment. De Lange (DJ Mark D) began DJing in 1984 and has been the resident of Roxy, Club Pacific Street, Rich's, XM Satellite Radio (ch 81 BPM) and 104.1 KRBE radio.  He now owns and operates nightclub/bar venues throughout Houston.  The duo soon collaborated and started a record label with the same name – Dirty Disco. They have been hired on numerous remix projects including Casablanca's "Enough Is Enough 2017" Donna Summer & Barbra Streisand, Diana Ross's "Upside Down/Coming Out" 2018 mashup along with other artists like Enrique Iglesias, the Trash Mermaids, U2, Paris Hilton, GusGus, Olivia Holt, Janet Jackson, KC & the Sunshine Band and others. To date, Dirty Disco has had numerous Billboard No. 1 dance singles on projects they were hired on and have numerous Billboard top 5 singles on their proprietary record label Dirty Disco Music (DDM).  They continue to produce dance singles at a record pace, sometimes a track a week.  Both De Lange and Arnold were Billboard reporting DJs.

Discography

Singles

References

Musical groups from Houston
Male musical duos
American house music duos
Electronic dance music duos